The first USS Milwaukee, a double-turreted  river monitor, the lead ship of her class, built for the Union Navy during the American Civil War. The ship supported Union forces during the Mobile Campaign as they attacked Confederate fortifications defending the city of Mobile, Alabama in early 1865. She struck a mine in March and sank without loss. Her wreck was raised in 1868 and broken up for scrap that was used in the construction of a bridge in St. Louis, Missouri.

Description

She had 970 tons burthen and displaced . Her crew numbered 138 officers and enlisted men.

The ship was powered by two 2-cylinder horizontal non-condensing steam engines, each driving two propellers, using steam generated by seven tubular boilers. Milwaukee carried  of coal.

The ship's main armament consisted of four smoothbore, muzzle-loading 11-inch Dahlgren guns mounted in two twin-gun turrets. Her forward turret was designed by James Eads and her rear turret by John Ericsson.

The cylindrical turrets were protected by eight layers of wrought iron  plates.

Construction and service

James Eads was awarded the contracts for all four of the Milwaukee-class ships. He laid down Milwaukee at his Union Iron Works Carondelet, St. Louis in 1862. The first U.S. Navy ship to be named after the Wisconsin city, she was launched on 4 February 1864 and commissioned on 27 August 1864. Acting Volunteer Lieutenant James W. Magune was in command.
 
Milwaukee was initially assigned to the Mississippi Squadron upon commissioning, but saw no action before she was ordered south to join West Gulf Blockading Squadron. The ship departed Mound City, Illinois on 15 October and arrived at New Orleans, Louisiana 12 days later. Lieutenant Commander James H. Gillis relieved Magune on 22 November. She was still under repair there on 27 November, although Milwaukee reached Mobile Bay by 1 January 1865.

Although the victory at the Battle of Mobile Bay on 5 August 1864 had closed the port of Mobile to blockade runners, the city itself had not been taken. The Confederates fortified the approaches to the city and heavily mined the shallow waters surrounding it. On 27 March 1865, Milwaukee, together with several other Union ships, sortied upriver in an attempt to cut communications between Spanish Fort and Mobile. The following day she and her sister ship  steamed up the Blakely River to attack a Confederate transport and forced it to retreat.  While returning downriver Milwaukee struck a mine in an area previously swept. She remained afloat forward, which permitted her crew to escape without loss. Another of her sisters, rescued the survivors.

In 1868 the wreck was raised and towed to St. Louis and broken up; her iron was used in the construction of the Eads Bridge across the Mississippi River.

Notes

References

External links

Photo gallery at Naval Historical Center

 

Milwaukee-class monitors
Ships built in St. Louis
1864 ships
Ships of the Union Navy
American Civil War monitors of the United States
Ships sunk by mines
Shipwrecks in rivers
Shipwrecks of the American Civil War
Maritime incidents in March 1865